Gary Lee Wilhelms (born January 17, 1938), was an American politician who was a member of the Oregon House of Representatives. He was House Republican Leader in 1979.

He was born in Astoria, Oregon and was a Manager for Pacific Northwest Bell. In 2011, Wilhelms was named Chief of Staff for Kevin Cameron, Oregon House Republican Leader. He also served as Chief of Staff for House Speakers Karen Minnis and Lynn Snodgrass and as Assistant to Senate President Brady Adams.  Wilhelms Co-Chaired the Public Commission on the Oregon Legislature and served as a member of the Oregon Government Ethics Commission.

References

1931 births
Living people
Republican Party members of the Oregon House of Representatives
Politicians from Astoria, Oregon
Eastern Oregon University alumni
Politicians from Klamath Falls, Oregon